Canthon quadriguttatus is a species of Scarabaeidae or scarab beetles. It is found in Brazil, Colombia and Suriname.

References

External links 
 
 Canthon quadriguttatus at insectoid.info

Deltochilini
Beetles described in 1789
Beetles of South America
Insects of Brazil
Arthropods of Colombia
Fauna of Suriname